CAT (Civil Aviation Training) is an international simulation and training publication produced bi-monthly in the UK by Halldale Media. CAT was first published in 1990, and has provided continuous, international coverage ever since with its worldwide team of journalists.

Halldale Media also publish CAT's sister publication Military Simulation & Training Magazine (MS&T).

Content 

Each issue of the magazine typically contains five or more major articles exploring the latest training and simulation issues for pilots, cabin crew and maintainers throughout the civil airline training industry. The journal's regular sections also include extended news and analysis, event reviews and an industry calendar.

Annual Training Sourcebook 
Issue 4 each year is the Annual Training Sourcebook (or Yearbook) and differs from the regular issues by incorporating additional content including a Year in Review article (a round-up of industry highlights over the past 12 months) and the Civil Full Flight Simulator Census. The 'Sim Census' provides information on more than 1,200 civil full flight simulators in use worldwide, with a summary of technical data which includes motion systems, image generators, display systems and approval level.

Events 
Since 1998, CAT has organised over 30 civil aviation training-related conferences worldwide to accompany the magazine. The annual shows include the World Aviation Training Conference and Tradeshow (WATS), the European Airline Training Symposium (EATS), and the Asia-Pacific Airline Training Symposium (APATS). CAT's flagship event - WATS - was launched in 1998 in London and has been held every year since, visiting various cities across the globe including Denver (1999), Frankfurt (2000), Atlanta (2001), Dallas (2002 & 2005), Montreal (2003), and Phoenix (2004), before settling in Orlando (2006 to date). EATS similarly is well traveled since its inception in 2002, visiting Stockholm, Frankfurt, Vienna (twice), Amsterdam, Berlin (twice), Prague (twice), and Istanbul. APATS has been held in Singapore (alongside Asian Aerospace 2006), Bangkok (2007, 2008 & 2011), Hong Kong (alongside Asian Aerospace 2007 & 2009) and Kuala Lumpur, Malaysia (2010). 2011 saw APATS Ab Initio & Evidence Based Training held alongside Asian Aerospace in Hong Kong in March.

Other conferences in the 'ATS' stable include RATS - Regional Airline Training Conference and Tradeshow (now part of WATS), BATS - Business Aviation Training Symposium, IATS - International Aviation Training Symposium, HATS - Helicopter Aviation Training Symposium, and ViSTech - Visuals & Simulation Technology Conference & Exhibition.

External links
CAT web site

Aviation magazines
Bi-monthly magazines published in the United Kingdom
Magazines established in 1990
Military magazines published in the United Kingdom